The Queensland Railways B9½ class locomotive was a class of 0-6-2 steam locomotives operated by the Queensland Railways.

History
Between 1924 and 1927, John Fowler & Co, Leeds delivered three 0-6-2 locomotives to the Queensland Railways. Per Queensland Railway's classification system they were designated the B9½ class, B representing they had two driving axles, and 9½ the cylinder diameter in inches. They operated on  Innisfail Tramway, all being withdrawn in the early 1960s. One has been preserved at the Australian Narrow Gauge Railway Museum Society, Woodford.

References

Railway locomotives introduced in 1924
B9
0-6-2 locomotives
Fowler locomotives